Lewis McKirdy (born 12 October 1987) is the outgoing host of Lunch on triple j.

References

External links
Profile at Triple J

Living people
Triple J announcers
People from the Sutherland Shire
1987 births
21st-century Australian people